IHU may refer to:

İbn Haldun Üniversitesi, Istanbul, Turkey
Ihu Airport (IATA airport code: IHU) in Papua New Guinea
Ihu Rural LLG in Papua New Guinea
Imam Hossein University, Tehran, Iran
Indian Humanist Union, in India
Institut hospitalo-universitaire, France

International Hellenic University, Thessaloniki, Greece; an English-language university
Irish Hockey Union, now part of the Irish Hockey Association, Ireland
Irish Homing Union, Ireland; a pigeon society

SARS-CoV-2 lineage B.1.640.2, also known as the "IHU variant".

See also

 lHU (disambiguation)